Strauss Mann (born August 18, 1998) is an American professional ice hockey goaltender for the San Jose Barracuda in the American Hockey League (AHL) as a prospect to the San Jose Sharks of the National Hockey League (NHL). He previously played for Skellefteå AIK of the Swedish Hockey League (SHL) and played college ice hockey at Michigan.

Playing career

Junior
Mann played for the Fargo Force during the 2017–18 season. He appeared in 34 games where he posted a 22–8–1 record, with a 1.86 goals-against average (GAA) and .932 save percentage. During the playoffs with the Force, he recorded a 2.09 GAA and a .932 save percentage.

College
Mann began his collegiate career for the University of Michigan during the 2018–19 season. During his freshman season, he appeared in 21 games, including 17 starts, where he posted a 6–8–4 record, with a 2.91 GAA and .895 save percentage.

During the 2019–20 season in his second year, Mann posted an 18–13–4 record with a 1.85 GAA and a .939 save percentage. He ranked third in the nation in save percentage and sixth in GAA. With six shutouts this season, Mann tied the Michigan single-season record and holds the single-season record for save percentage and GAA in program history. Following an outstanding season he was named Big Ten Goaltender of the Year, first-team All-Big Ten, and a top-five finalist for the Mike Richter Award.

On September 10, 2020, Mann was named team captain for the 2020–21 season. He became the first goalie to be a captain for Michigan in 78 years and the first non-senior captain in five years. During his junior year he posted an 11–9–1 record, with a 1.89 GAA and .930 save percentage. He was subsequently named a finalist for Big Ten Goaltender of the Year and the Mike Richter Award.

Professional
On July 6, 2021, Mann signed a professional contract with Skellefteå AIK of the SHL. He made his professional debut on September 18, 2021. He appeared in 22 games for Skelleftea AIK, where he recorded a 13–8–1 record, with a 2.19 GAA, a .914 save percentage and three shutouts. He ranked tied for fourth in the league in GAA, fifth in save percentage, and tied for sixth in shutouts.

On April 19, 2022, Mann signed a one-year contract with the San Jose Sharks of the NHL.

International play
On January 13, 2022, Mann was named to Team USA's roster to represent the United States at the 2022 Winter Olympics.

On May 5, 2022, Mann was named to Team USA's roster to compete at the 2022 IIHF World Championship. He posted a 3–1 record, with a 2.42 GAA and .888 save percentage.

Career statistics

Regular season and playoffs

International

Awards and honors

References

External links

1998 births
Living people
American ice hockey goaltenders
Fargo Force players
Ice hockey players from Connecticut
Jewish ice hockey players
Michigan Wolverines men's ice hockey players
San Jose Barracuda players
Skellefteå AIK players
Sportspeople from Greenwich, Connecticut
Ice hockey players at the 2022 Winter Olympics
Olympic ice hockey players of the United States
Wichita Thunder players